Hubert of Palestrina was an Italian papal legate and Cardinal. He was created bishop of Palestrina in 1068. He was legate, with Gerald of Ostia, to the Emperor Henry IV, for Pope Gregory VII; a temporary reconciliation was achieved in 1074  They also asserted papal authority over Liemar, archbishop of Bremen.

Notes

11th-century Italian cardinals
Cardinal-bishops of Palestrina
Diplomats of the Holy See
11th-century Italian Roman Catholic bishops